Girija Dam, is an earthfill dam on Girija river near Khultabad, Aurangabad district  in the state of Maharashtra in India.

Specifications

Purpose
 Irrigation

See also
 Dams in Maharashtra
 List of reservoirs and dams in India

References

Dams in Aurangabad district, Maharashtra
Dams completed in 1986
1986 establishments in Maharashtra